The masked lark (Spizocorys personata) is a species of lark in the family Alaudidae. It is found in Ethiopia and Kenya. Its natural habitats are subtropical or tropical dry shrubland and subtropical or tropical dry lowland grassland.

Taxonomy and systematics
Some authorities have placed the masked lark in the genus Calandrella.

Subspecies
Four subspecies are recognized: 
 S. p. personata - Sharpe, 1895: Found in eastern Ethiopia
 S. p. yavelloensis - (Benson, 1947): Found in southern Ethiopia and northern Kenya
 S. p. mcchesneyi - (Williams, JG, 1957): Found on the Marsabit Plateau (northern Kenya)
 S. p. intensa - (Rothschild, 1931): Found in central Kenya

References

masked lark
Birds of East Africa
masked lark
Taxonomy articles created by Polbot